dd is a command-line utility for Unix, Plan 9, Inferno, and Unix-like operating systems and beyond, the primary purpose of which is to convert and copy files. On Unix, device drivers for hardware (such as hard disk drives) and special device files (such as /dev/zero and /dev/random) appear in the file system just like normal files;  can also read and/or write from/to these files, provided that function is implemented in their respective driver. As a result,  can be used for tasks such as backing up the boot sector of a hard drive, and obtaining a fixed amount of random data. The  program can also perform conversions on the data as it is copied, including byte order swapping and conversion to and from the ASCII and EBCDIC text encodings.

History 
The name  is an allusion to the DD statement found in IBM's Job Control Language (JCL), in which it is an abbreviation for "Data Definition". The command's syntax resembles a JCL statement more than other Unix commands do, so much that Eric S. Raymond says "the interface design was clearly a prank". The interface is redesigned in Plan 9's dd command to use a command-line option style. dd is sometimes humorously called "Disk Destroyer", due to its drive-erasing capabilities.

Originally intended to convert between ASCII and EBCDIC,  first appeared in Version 5 Unix.  The  command is specified since the X/Open Portability Guide issue 2 of 1987. This is inherited by IEEE Std 1003.1-2008 (POSIX), which is part of the Single UNIX Specification.

The version of dd bundled in GNU coreutils was written by Paul Rubin, David MacKenzie, and Stuart Kemp. The command is available as a separate package for Microsoft Windows as part of the UnxUtils collection of native Win32 ports of common GNU Unix-like utilities.

Usage 
The command line syntax of  differs from many other Unix programs. It uses the syntax  for its command-line options rather than the more standard  or  formats.

Certain features of  will depend on the computer system capabilities, such as 's ability to implement an option for direct memory access. Sending a SIGINFO signal (or a USR1 signal on Linux) to a running  process makes it print I/O statistics to standard error once and then continue copying.  can read standard input from the keyboard. When end-of-file (EOF) is reached,  will exit. Signals and EOF are determined by the software. For example, Unix tools ported to Windows vary as to the EOF: Cygwin uses  (the usual Unix EOF) and MKS Toolkit uses  (the usual Windows EOF).

The non-standardized parts of dd invocation vary among implementations.

Output messages 
On completion,  prints to the stderr stream about statistics of the data transfer. The format is standardized in POSIX. The manual page for GNU dd does not describe this format, but the BSD manuals do.

Each of the "Records in" and "Records out" lines shows the number of complete blocks transferred + the number of partial blocks, e.g. because the physical medium ended before a complete block was read, or a physical error prevented reading the complete block.

Block size 
A block is a unit measuring the number of bytes that are read, written, or converted at one time. The default value for both input and output block sizes is 512 bytes (the traditional block size of disks, and POSIX-mandated size of "a block"). The  option for copying is measured in blocks, as are both the  count for reading and  count for writing. Conversion operations are also affected by the "conversion block size".

The value provided for block size options is interpreted as a decimal (base 10) integer number of bytes. It can also contain suffixes to indicate that the block size is an integer number of larger units than bytes. For example, for GNU ,  indicates a blocksize of 16 mebibytes (16777216 bytes) and  specifies 3000 bytes.

Additionally, some implementations understand the  character as a multiplication operator for both block size and count parameters.  For example,  is interpreted as 2 × 80 × 18 × 512 = , the exact size of a 1440 KiB floppy disk. This is required in POSIX, but GNU does not seem to support it. As a result, it is more portable to use the POSIX shell arithmetic syntax of bs=$((2*80*18))b.

Block size has an effect on the performance of copying  commands. Doing many small reads or writes is often slower than doing fewer large ones.  Using large blocks requires more RAM and can complicate error recovery.  When  is used with variable-block-size devices such as tape drives or networks, the block size may determine the tape record size or packet size, depending on the network protocol used.

Uses 
The  command can be used for a variety of purposes. For plain-copying commands it tends to be slower than the domain-specific alternatives, but it excels at its unique ability to "overwrite or truncate a file at any point or seek in a file", a fairly low-level interface to the Unix file API.

The examples below assume the use of GNU dd, mainly in the block size argument.

Data transfer 
 can duplicate data across files, devices, partitions and volumes. The data may be input or output to and from any of these; but there are important differences concerning the output when going to a partition. Also, during the transfer, the data can be modified using the  options to suit the medium.

The  option means to keep going if there is an error, while the  option causes output blocks to be padded.

In-place modification 
 can modify data in place.  For example, this overwrites the first 512 bytes of a file with null bytes:

The  conversion option means do not truncate the output file — that is, if the output file already exists, just replace the specified bytes and leave the rest of the output file alone. Without this option,  would create an output file 512 bytes long.

Master boot record backup and restore 
The example above can also be used to back up and restore any region of a device to a file, such as a master boot record.

To duplicate the first two sectors of a floppy disk:

Disk wipe 

For security reasons, it is sometimes necessary to have a disk wipe of a discarded device. This can be achieved by a "data transfer" from the Unix special files.

 To write zeros to a disk, use dd if=/dev/zero of=/dev/sda bs=16M.
 To write random data to a disk, use dd if=/dev/urandom of=/dev/sda bs=16M.

When compared to the data modification example above,  conversion option is not required as it has no effect when the 's output file is a block device.

The  option makes dd read and write 16 mebibytes at a time. For modern systems, an even greater block size may be faster. Note that filling the drive with random data may take longer than zeroing the drive, because the random data must be created by the CPU, while creating zeroes is very fast. On modern hard-disk drives, zeroing the drive will render most data it contains permanently irrecoverable.  However, with other kinds of drives such as flash memories, much data may still be recoverable by data remanence.

Modern hard disk drives contain a Secure Erase command designed to permanently and securely erase every accessible and inaccessible portion of a drive.  It may also work for some solid-state drives (flash drives).  As of 2017, it does not work on USB flash drives nor on Secure Digital flash memories.  When available, this is both faster than using dd, and more secure.  On Linux machines it is accessible via the hdparm command's  option.

The shred program offers multiple overwrites, as well as more secure deletion of individual files.

Data recovery 
Data recovery involves reading from a drive with some parts potentially inaccessible.  is a good fit with this job with its flexible skipping and other low-level settings. The vanilla , however, is clumsy to use as the user has to read the error messages and manually calculate the regions that can be read. The single block size also limits the granuarity of the recovery, as a trade-off has to be made: either use a small one for more data recovered or use a large one for speed.

A C program called   was written in October 1999. If a read using a large size fails, it falls back to the smaller size to gather as much as data possible. It can also run backwards. In 2003, a  script was written to automate the process of using , keeping track of what areas have been read on its own.

It has a more sophisticated dynamic block-size algorithm and keeps track of what has been read internally. The authors of both  and  consider it superior to their implementation.

Another open-source program called  uses a sophisticated algorithm, but it also requires the installation of its own programming-language interpreter.

Benchmarking drive performance 
To make drive benchmark test and analyze the sequential (and usually single-threaded) system read and write performance for 1024-byte blocks:
 Write performance: dd if=/dev/zero bs=1024 count=1000000 of=1GB_file_to_write
 Read performance: dd if=1GB_file_to_read of=/dev/null bs=1024

Generating a file with random data 
To make a file of 100 random bytes using the kernel random driver:

Converting a file to upper case 
To convert a file to uppercase:

Progress indicator 
Being a program mainly designed as a filter,  normally does not provide any progress indication. This can be overcome by sending an  signal to the running GNU  process ( on BSD systems), resulting in  printing the current number of transferred blocks.

The following one-liner results in continuous output of progress every 10 seconds until the transfer is finished, when  is replaced by the process-id of : 

Newer versions of GNU  support the  option, which enables periodic printing of transfer statistics to stderr.

Forks

dcfldd 
 is a fork of GNU  that is an enhanced version developed by Nick Harbour, who at the time was working for the United States'  Department of Defense Computer Forensics Lab. The last release was in 2021.

dc3dd 
 is another enhanced GNU  from the United States Department of Defense Cyber Crime Center (DC3). It can be seen as a continuation of the dcfldd, with a stated aim of updating whenever the GNU upstream is updated. Its last release was in 2018.

See also 

 Backup
 Disk cloning
 Disk Copy
 Disk image
 .img (filename extension)
 List of Unix commands
 ddrescue a GNU version that copies data from corrupted files

References

External links 

 
 
 
 dd: manual page from the GNU Core Utilities.
 
 dd for Windows.
 savehd7 – save a potentially damaged harddisk partition
 Softpanorama dd page.
 DD at Linux Questions Wiki.
 Forensics (DD) Dcfldd
 ddpt – a variant specialized in files that are block devices
 sg_dd –  Linux specialized variant for devices that use the SCSI command set

Data recovery software
Disk cloning
Hard disk software
Standard Unix programs
Unix SUS2008 utilities
Plan 9 commands
Inferno (operating system) commands
Data erasure software